Ioannis Spanopoulos (born 20 May 1993) is a Greek professional racing cyclist. He rode at the 2015 UCI Track Cycling World Championships.

Major results
Source: 

2010
 National Junior Road Championships
2nd Time trial
3rd Road race
2011
 National Junior Road Championships
1st  Time trial
1st  Road race
2012
 2nd Time trial, National Under-23 Road Championships
2013
 1st  Time trial, National Under-23 Road Championships
2014
 2nd Road race, National Under-23 Road Championships
2015
 3rd Time trial, National Road Championships

References

External links

1993 births
Living people
Greek male cyclists
Sportspeople from Athens
21st-century Greek people